Emacspeak is a free computer application, a speech interface, and an audio desktop (as opposed to a screen reader). It employs Emacs (which is written in C), Emacs Lisp, and Tcl. Developed principally by T. V. Raman (himself blind since childhood, and who has worked on voice software with Adobe Software and later IBM), it was first released in April 1995. It is portable to all POSIX-compatible OSs. It is tightly integrated with Emacs, allowing it to render intelligible and useful content rather than parsing the graphics (hence it is sometimes referred to not as a separate program, but a subsystem of Emacs); its default voice synthesizer (as of 2002, IBM's ViaVoice Text-to-Speech (TTS)) can be replaced with other software synthesizers when a server module is installed. Emacspeak is one of the most popular speech interfaces for Linux, bundled with most major distributions. The following article is written on 20th anniversary of Emacspeak 

Emacspeak achieves its integration by being written largely in Emacs Lisp using "advice", enabling it to literally be a wrapper around most functions that change or otherwise modify the display. Auditorily, verbalizations are pre-emptible, and common actions like opening a menu or closing a file have a brief sound associated with that particular action; it also immediately verbalizes all insertions of characters, and attempts to speak as much of the context sentences around the cursor's present location as possible.

Emacspeak facilitates access to a wide variety of content, from the web to DAISY books.

On Monday, April 12, 1999, Emacspeak became part of the Smithsonian Museum's Permanent Research Collection on Information Technology at the Smithsonian's National Museum of American History.

Version history
As of January 10, 2023, Emacspeak is at version 57. Each release was codenamed after a dog.

References
http://emacspeak.sourceforge.net/#synths

External links

 
 
 Official list of Emacs applications that work with Emacspeak (~146); notably Sawfish, Dired, w3m/lynx, erc, mplayer, OpenSSH, ispell etc.
 Emacspeak mailing list
 Paper on Emacspeak by T. V. Raman
 Blog by T. V. Raman, on using Emacspeak
 Emacspeak Installation HOWTO -(from The Linux Documentation Project)
 
 "A Gentle Introduction to Emacspeak: a quickstart for normal people"
 
 Emacspeak on the EmacsWiki
 Emacspeak Tricks

Emacs
Free screen readers
Free software programmed in C
Free software programmed in Lisp
Free software programmed in Tcl